The Princess and the Robot is a 1984 Brazilian animated film based on the Monica's Gang comic books. It was the second film based on Monica's Gang and the first to present an original story, since the other movies are just episodes of the cartoon, until the movie Uma Aventura no Tempo of 2007.

Plot 
In a small heart-shaped planet, there is a pulsating star that ends up shooting through space and lands on another planet, called Carrotland (Cenourano, in the original), striking a robot that is passionate about the princess of the kingdom where he lives: Princess Mimi.

The Robot (called Little Robot by the characters) disputes the love of the princess through a tournament against many opponent. Among them is Lord Raider (Lorde Coelhão), a space traveler in search of fortune and wealth. The tournament ends with a tie between Raider and the Robot, and the famous coin toss is made, where the player chooses between heads or tails. Lord Raider chooses tails and Little Robot chooses heads, so the coin is tossed.

The Robot wins the match, but Lord Raider, jealous, says that the little robot can not be the new boyfriend of the Princess, as he doesn't have a real heart. The King agrees, but says that the robot has a chance to win the love of the Princess: The robot must go to where the star is pulsating, pick it up and put it inside his engine to have a true heart.

The King gives a small amount of time for the robot to reach the star; if he does not return before his time is up, Lord Raider will marry the princess instead.

After that the robot walks without knowing what to do in the streets of the kingdom when he is attacked by Lord Raider, which uses its radius packer (a kind of weapon that packs victims when it is released) and transforms it into a gift box.

That done, Lord Raider sends his assistants to leave the package in a place far from Carrotland. The robot assistants (led by Bugeye, a species of dragonfly, accomplice of Lord Raider) decide to throw the package on Planet Earth, where it falls near the backyard of Jimmy Five. The impact of the fall is so strong, that the noise sounds like a blast. Monica and her friends hear the noise and runs to the direction of the package, open and release the Little Robot, that tells how he came to Earth. After the story is told, the gang decides to help him, asking Franklin to build a ship. But they do not know Bugeye had fallen along with the package and was listening to all the talk of the gang hiding behind a rock. He warns Lord Raider that the children will help the Robot find his heart.

Voice cast
 André Luis as the Robot
 Marli Bortoletto as Monica
 Angélica Santos as Jimmy Five
 Elza Gonçalves as Maggy
 Paulo Camargo as Smugde
 Denise Simonetto as Angel
 Araquem Saldanha as Lord Raider
 Flora Maria Fernandes as Princess Mimi
 Orlando Vigiani Filho as Franklin
 Marthus Matias as the King of Carrotland

References

External links
 
  (Full movie in the official Youtube channel)

1984 films
1984 animated films
Animated comedy films
Brazilian animated science fiction films
Monica's Gang films
Animated films based on comics